In the mathematical study of combinatorics on words, a parameter word is a string over a given alphabet having some number of wildcard characters. The set of strings matching a given parameter word is called a parameter set or combinatorial cube. Parameter words can be composed, to produce smaller subcubes of a given combinatorial cube. They have applications in Ramsey theory and in computer science in the detection of duplicate code.

Definitions and notation
Each wildcard character is required to appear at least once, but may appear multiple times, and the wildcard characters must appear in the order given by their indexes: the first wildcard character in the word must be , the next one that is different from  must be , etc. As a special case, a word over the given 
alphabet, without any wildcard characters, is said to be a 0-parameter word. For 1-parameter words, the subscripts may be omitted, as there is no ambiguity between different wildcard characters.

A one-dimensional combinatorial cube may be called a combinatorial line.

In a combinatorial cube, each copy of a particular wildcard character must have the same replacement. A generalization of parameter words allows different copies of the same wildcard character to be replaced by different characters from the alphabet, in a controlled way. The first occurrence of each wildcard character must be assigned the identity element of the group.

Example
In the game of tic-tac-toe, the cells of the game board can be given two integer coordinates  from the alphabet . The corresponding combinatorial lines form seven of the eight lines of three cells in a row of the tic-tac-toe board; for instance, the one-parameter word  corresponds to the combinatorial line , and the one-parameter word  corresponds to the combinatorial 

However, one of the eight winning lines of the tic-tac-toe game is missing from this set of combinatorial lines: the antidiagonal  It is possible to obtain this line as a combinatorial line (without including any other combinations of cells that would be invalid for tic-tac-toe) by using a group with two elements, and an action in which the non-identity element swaps the alphabet letters  and  while leaving the element  in place. There are eight labeled one-parameter words of length two for this action, seven of which are obtained from the unlabeled one-parameter words by using the identity label for all wildcards. These seven have the same combinatorial lines as before. The eighth labeled word consists of the word  labeled by the identity element for its first  and the reversing non-identity element for the second ; its combinatorial line is the final winning line of the tic-tac-toe board,

Composition
This notion of composition can also be extended to composition of labeled parameter words (both using the same alphabet and group action), by applying the group action to the non-wildcard substituted characters and composing the group labels for the wildcard substituted characters. A subset of a combinatorial cube is a smaller combinatorial cube if it can be obtained by a composition in this way.

Combinatorial enumeration
These numbers count the number of partitions of the integers in the range  into  non-empty subsets such that the first  integers belong to distinct subsets. Partitions of this type can be placed into a bijective equivalence with the parameter words, by creating a word with a character for each of the  integers in the range ,
The -Stirling numbers obey a simple recurrence relation by which they may easily be calculated.

Applications

In computer science, in the problem of searching for duplicate code,
the source code for a given routine or module may be transformed into a parameter word by converting it into a sequence of tokens,
and for each variable or subroutine name, replacing each copy of the same name with the same wildcard character. If code is duplicated, the resulting parameter words will remain equal even if some of the variables or subroutines have been renamed. More sophisticated searching algorithms can find long duplicate code sections that form substrings of larger source code repositories, by allowing the wildcard characters to be substituted for each other. 

An important special case of parameter words, well-studied in the combinatorics of words, is given by the partial words. These are strings with wildcard characters that may be substituted independently of each other, without requiring that some of the substituted characters be equal or controlled by a group action. In the language of parameter words, a partial word may be described as a parameter word in which each wildcard symbol appears exactly once. However, because there is no repetition of wildcard symbols, partial words may be written more simply by omitting the subscripts on the wildcard symbols.

See also

 Regular expression

References

Combinatorics on words